Nulsen, Nülsen or Nuelsen may refer to:

People
 Emil Nulsen (1885–1965), Australian politician
 John Louis Nuelsen (1867–1946), German-American bishop

Other
 Nulsen, Western Australia, a western suburb of Esperance